Türkan Haliloğlu is a Turkish biochemist researching biopolymers, computational structural biology, protein dynamics, binding and folding of proteins, and protein interactions. She is a professor in the department of chemical engineering and director of the polymer research center at the Boğaziçi University.

Education 
Türkan Haliloğlu earned a BS (1987), MS (1989), and PhD (1992) in chemical engineering Boğaziçi University. From 1992 to 1993, she was a postdoctoral researcher at the University of Akron Institute of Polymer Science.

Career and research 
Haliloğlu is a professor in the department of chemical engineering and director of the polymer research center at the Boğaziçi University. She researches biopolymers, computational structural biology, protein dynamics, binding and folding of proteins, and protein interactions.

Awards and honors 
In 2012, Haliloğlu became a member of the Turkish Academy of Sciences. In 2018, the NATO Deputy Secretary General, Rose Gottemoeller, presented Haliloğlu with the partnership prize from the NATO Science for Peace and Security for her molecular research on bacteria used in biological weapons.

References

External links 

 

Year of birth missing (living people)
Place of birth missing (living people)
Living people
Members of the Turkish Academy of Sciences
Boğaziçi University alumni
Academic staff of Boğaziçi University
Turkish women chemists
Turkish chemists
Turkish biochemists
20th-century chemists
21st-century chemists
Women biochemists
20th-century biologists
21st-century biologists
20th-century women scientists
21st-century women scientists
Polymer scientists and engineers
Computational biologists
Women computational biologists